Richard Sands (born 14 March 1947) is an Australian equestrian. He competed in two events at the 1972 Summer Olympics.

References

1947 births
Living people
Australian male equestrians
Olympic equestrians of Australia
Equestrians at the 1972 Summer Olympics
Place of birth missing (living people)